C's may refer to:

 The Boston Celtics, American basketball franchise
 Citizens (Spanish political party)